Time in Guinea is given by a single time zone, denoted as Greenwich Mean Time (GMT; UTC±00:00). Guinea shares this time zone with several other countries, including fourteen in western Africa. Guinea does not observe daylight saving time (DST).

History 
French Guinea—the French colonial possession that preceded Guinea—first adopted UTC−01:00 on 1 January 1912.

IANA time zone database 
In the IANA time zone database, Guinea is given one zone in the file zone.tab – Africa/Conakry, which is an alias to Africa/Abidjan. "GN" refers to the country's ISO 3166-1 alpha-2 country code. Data for Guinea directly from zone.tab of the IANA time zone database; columns marked with * are the columns from zone.tab itself:

See also 
Time in Africa
List of time zones by country

References

External links 
Current time in Guinea at Time.is
Time in Guinea at TimeAndDate.com

Time in Guinea